Sony Spin was a Latin American cable television channel, launched on 1 May 2011, replacing the local version of Animax. It was shut down on 1 July 2014 due to low ratings and reception.

History
Formerly known as Animax, it was Sony's first attempt to offer a 24-hour anime channel in Latin America, replacing Locomotion. On 1 July 2014, Sony Spin was removed from pay-TV providers and replaced with a localised variant of A&E’s Lifetime, a television network targeted at female audiences.

Programming

Former programming as of cancellation 
 90210
 The Adventures of Merlin
 Amar y temer
 Blue Mountain State
 Joan of Arcadia
 That '70s Show

Former programming
 18 to Life
 Archer
 Being Human (North America)
 Beverly Hills 90210
 Black Cat
 Black Jack
 Bleach
 Blood+
 Call Me Fitz
 Clueless
 Dead Like Me
 Death Note
 Fate/stay night
 Fullmetal Alchemist: Brotherhood
 Gamers TV
 Get Backers
 Glory Daze
 Is She Really Going Out With Him?
 Jake & Blake
 Jane by Design
 Kenny vs. Spenny
 Look
 Lost
 Lost Girl (currently seen on AXN)
 Make It or Break It
 Melissa & Joey (currently seen on Canal Sony)
 Next Stop for Charlie
 The Nine Lives of Chloe King
 Parker Lewis Can't Lose
 Punk'd (only seen on Brazil)
 Rock Road
 Samurai 7
 Samurai X
 Sesiones con Alejandro Franco
 Sesiones Off Season
 State of Georgia
 Switched at Birth
 Teen Wolf (currently seen on Canal Sony)
 Time of Your Life
 Warp TV

Former programming as Animax
 10 Things I Hate About You
 American Dreams
 The Best Years (repeats currently seen in Brazil on Multishow)
 Blood Ties
 The Boondocks
 Distraction
 Fullmetal Alchemist
 FusionA2 (not seen in Brazil, where a version was aired on MTV, as Estúdio Coca-Cola Zero)
 In the Qube
 Kaya
 Lil' Bush
 Living Lahaina
 Maui Fever
 The Middleman
 Planet Survival
 Ruby and the Rockits
 Spaceballs: The Animated Series
 The Prince of Tennis
 Twin Spica
 The Twelve Kingdoms

Translation and dubbing teams
Several dubbing studios have participated in the translation of the aforementioned series for their premiere on Animax, and are located in key countries like Mexico, Brazil, Argentina and Venezuela. After Animax's arrival in 2005, numerous series were translated and dubbed into Spanish and Portuguese languages, including Blood+, The Twelve Kingdoms, Steel Angel Kurumi, Noir, Wolf's Rain, Martian Successor Nadesico, Galaxy Angel and others.

See also 
 AXN Spin

References

External links 
 

Latin American cable television networks
Anime television
Defunct television channels
Television channels and stations established in 2011
Television channels and stations disestablished in 2014
Sony Pictures Entertainment
Sony Pictures Television
Defunct television channels and networks in Venezuela
Defunct television channels in Brazil